The Wigomat was the world's first electrical drip coffee maker and patented in 1954 in Germany. It was named after the inventor Gottlob Widmann "Wi-go-mat", although some early machines were delivered as "FK-1" (for filter coffee machine).

History
Coffee was, until the late 1950s, brewed by hand or made in a percolator. In both cases the temperature was considered to be too high. Therefore, at the launch of the Wigomat it was advertised to have the best brewing temperature. In the 1970s many machines followed the principle of drip coffee, but the Wigomat remained one of the best: "The people at Zabar's tell us that their Wigomat Coffee Maker is one of the best of the currently popular instant-drip coffee makers" wrote a New York-based magazine in 1975.

References

External links

Wigomat: Eine Hommage an die erste Filterkaffeemaschine der Welt (archived March 20, 2018)

Coffee preparation
German inventions
1954 introductions
1954 in Germany
Products introduced in 1954